Vance W. Amory International Airport  serves the island of Nevis in the Federation of Saint Kitts and Nevis. The airport has a single runway, which is approximately 1,220 meters (4,000 feet) long. The airport is located just west of the village Newcastle, Nevis, in Saint James Windward Parish.

The airport was previously known as Bambooshay Airport, then Newcastle Airport. It was renamed in 2002 after the Premier of Nevis, Vance Amory, following the completion of a new, more modern terminal, a new control tower, and an extension to the runway. The airport is available to many aircraft, it being an international airport.

Airlines and destinations

Cargo

References

Airports in Saint Kitts and Nevis
Buildings and structures in Nevis